Tjörneshreppur is a municipality in Iceland, part of the Norðurland eystra region. It is surrounded by the Norðurþing municipality on land, but has significant coastline.

References

Municipalities of Iceland
Northeastern Region (Iceland)